Harchandpur is a constituency of the Uttar Pradesh Legislative Assembly covering the city of Harchandpur in the Rae Bareli district of Uttar Pradesh, India.

Harchandpur is one of five assembly constituencies in the Lok Sabha constituency of Rae Bareli. Since 2008, this assembly constituency is numbered 179 amongst 403 constituencies.

Election results

2022 
Samajwadi Party candidate Rahul Rajpoot won in 2022 Uttar Pradesh Legislative Elections defeating BJP candidate Rakesh Singh by a margin of  14,489 votes.

2017
Indian National Congress candidate Rakesh Singh won in 2017 Uttar Pradesh Legislative Elections defeating BJP candidate Kanchan Lodhi by a margin of  3,652 votes.

2012

References

External links
 

Assembly constituencies of Uttar Pradesh
Raebareli district